Charles Vincent Fornes (January 22, 1844 – May 22, 1929) was an American educator and politician who served three terms as a United States representative from New York from 1907 to 1913.

Early life and career 
Born on a farm near Williamsville, Erie County, he attended the public schools, and was graduated from Union Academy (in Lockport) in 1864.

He moved to Buffalo in 1866, taught school in a district school, and then served as principal of a Buffalo public school for three years. He was employed as a clerk for a wholesale woolen merchant in Buffalo and later established a similar business for himself. In 1877 he moved to New York City and engaged in business as an importer and jobber of woolens.

He was president of the board of aldermen of New York City from 1902 to 1907, and was trustee and director of several banks and corporations.

Congress 
Fornes was elected as a Democrat to the 60th, 61st, and 62nd sessions of Congress, holding office from March 4, 1907 to March 3, 1913. He declined to be a candidate for renomination in 1912.

Later career and death 
He resumed his former business pursuits in New York City. He retired from active business in 1926 and returned to Buffalo, where he died in 1929; interment was in United German and French Roman Catholic Cemetery, Pine Hill, Buffalo.

References

External links

 

1844 births
1929 deaths
Politicians from Buffalo, New York
New York City Council members
Democratic Party members of the United States House of Representatives from New York (state)